Nizhnealkashevo (Tübänge Älkäş) is a rural locality (a village) in Ismailovsky Selsoviet, Dyurtyulinsky District, Bashkortostan, Russia. The population was 145 as of 2010. There are 2 streets.

Geography 
Nizhnealkashevo is located 16 km northwest of Dyurtyuli (the district's administrative centre) by road. Verkhnealkashevo is the nearest rural locality.

References 

Rural localities in Dyurtyulinsky District